Brynmawr Urban District was an urban district in Brecknockshire in existence from 1894 to 1974. It was succeeded by Blaenau Gwent.

References

Urban districts of Wales
Brecknockshire